Bethany is a borough in Wayne County, Pennsylvania. The borough's population was 246 at the time of the 2010 United States Census.

History
The borough was named after Bethany, a place mentioned in the Bible.

The Wilmot House and Wilmot Mansion are listed on the National Register of Historic Places.

Geography
Bethany is located at  (41.614321, -75.288537).

Demographics

As of the census of 2010, there were 246 people, 108 households, and 73 families residing in the borough. The racial makeup of the borough was 98% White, 1.6% African American, and 0.4% American Indian or Alaska Native. Hispanic or Latino of any race were 1.6% of the population.

There were 108 households, out of which 25.9% had children under the age of 18 living with them, 56.5% were married couples living together, 8.3% had a female householder with no husband present, and 32.4% were non-families. 26.9% of all households were made up of individuals, and 13% had someone living alone who was 65 years of age or older. The average household size was 2.28 and the average family size was 2.75.

In the borough the population was spread out, with 19.1% under the age of 18, 59.8% from 18 to 64, and 21.1% who were 65 years of age or older. The median age was 48 years.

The median income for a household in the borough was $39,167, and the median income for a family was $41,161. Males had a median income of $29,167 versus $26,042 for females. The per capita income for the borough was $21,683. About 3.2% of families and 6.8% of the population were below the poverty line, including 4.3% of those under the age of eighteen and 3.6% of those 65 or over.

Notable people
John Azor Kellogg, military leader and Wisconsin politician
David Wilmot, politician
George Washington Woodward, failed nominee to the Supreme Court, member of the US House of Representatives

References

External links

Boroughs in Wayne County, Pennsylvania
Populated places established in 1800
1800 establishments in Pennsylvania